Larry "Ratso" Sloman (born July 9, 1950) is a New York-based author.

Career
Sloman was born into a middle-class Jewish family from Queens. His nickname Ratso came from Joan Baez who said Sloman looked like Dustin Hoffman's character Ratso Rizzo in Midnight Cowboy.

He wrote for Rolling Stone, Crawdaddy, and Creem in the 1970s. He wrote a column "Ratso's Pallazo" in Heavy Metal in 1985.

He collaborated with Howard Stern on the radio personality's two best-selling books, Private Parts and Miss America. He also appears in all of Kinky Friedman's mystery novels as the Dr. Watson to Kinky's Sherlock. Sloman wrote  an account of Bob Dylan's 1975 Rolling Thunder Revue tour, On the Road with Bob Dylan. He also penned Reefer Madness, a history of marijuana use in the United States, Thin Ice: A Season in Hell with the New York Rangers, a 1982 on- and off-ice account of the National Hockey League team's 1979–80 season and Steal This Dream, an oral biography of Abbie Hoffman.

His book The Secret Life of Houdini, written with magic historian William Kalush, presented research that attempted to prove that early 20th-century American magician Harry Houdini was a spy. The authors also raised the possibility that Houdini had been murdered by a cabal of Spiritualists, prompting Houdini's great-nephew to call for an exhumation of the magician's body to test for poisoning.

Sloman's other collaborations include Mysterious Stranger, with the magician David Blaine and Scar Tissue, the autobiography of the Red Hot Chili Peppers lead singer Anthony Kiedis.

Starting in 1985, for a few years Sloman served as executive editor of National Lampoon magazine. He was also editor-in-chief of High Times.

On 5 April 2019 he released an album, Stubborn Heart, that includes a duet with Nick Cave, among others. Sloman and George Lois directed the music video for Bob Dylan's song "Jokerman."

Works

Further reading

References

External links

Website  at SimonSays.com

Interview Leon Charney November 2006
Larry Sloman BroadwayWorld

1950 births
American non-fiction writers
Historians of magic
Writers from New York (state)
Living people
Place of birth missing (living people)
Jewish American writers
21st-century American Jews
Cannabis writers